Soukaina Boukries (born 18 March 1988) is a Moroccan singer who rose to popularity as a contestant in both the 9th season of Studio 2M and the 9th season of Star Academy Arab World.

Studio 2M 2012

Soukaina Boukries participated in the 9th season of the show Studio 2M in Morocco and reached the semi-finals of this program after it was exclusion by the Committee.

Performances in Studio 2M 2012 
 1st Prime : Unfaithful - Rihanna
 2nd Prime : Waka Waka - Shakira
 3rd Prime : You Lost Me  - Christina Aguilera
 4th Prime : Firework - Katy Perry
 5th Prime : Pour que tu m'aimes encore - Celine Dion

Star Academy 9

Soukaina Boukries competed in the 9th season of the show Star Academy Arab World. She went on to also win the title of 'Shakira Arab' and the title of 'The Diamond'. Soukaina was nominated Thrice on the show. During her first nomination she was brought back by public vote. During her second nomination she was brought back again by public vote, achieving the highest vote percentage (77.31%) of this season. During her third nomination in Semi-final, she came out of the competition by a narrow margin in the vote (49.88%).

Ajmal Snin Omrina 

Soukaina Boukries has participated in Ajmel Snin Omrina on CBC, she presented nine shows in six episodes in this program which is produced by Endemol Middle East 2014.

Performances in Ajmal Snin Omrina 
 1st Performance : I Wanna Be Loved By You - Marilyn Monroe
 2nd Performance : La vie en Rose - Edith Piaf
 3rd Performance : I Have Nothing  - Whitney Houston
 4th Performance : My heart will go on - Celine Dion
 5th Performance : Voulez vous - ABBA
 6th Performance : Ahssan Nass - Dalida
 7th Performance : Bessame Mucho - Dalida
 8th Performance : Helwa Ya Baladi - Dalida
 9th Performance : That's the way I like it - KC and The Sunshine Band

Discography

Singles 
 Tghazzal Fiyyi

Awards 

 She won the title of " The Best Talent in Arab World 2014 " by referendum.
 Soukaina Boukries was nominated by public vote in Shorty Awards.
 Soukaina Boukries won the Lebanon Awards (SuperStar of Tomorrow) in 2015.

|-
|2014
|Best Singer
|Shorty Awards
|
|-
|2015
|Best Singer
|Shorty Awards
|
|-
|2015
|SuperStar of Tomorrow
|Lebanon Awards
|
|-
|}

References

Social media 
 Facebook
 Twitter
 Instagram

Living people
Moroccan pop singers
21st-century Moroccan women singers
English-language singers
1988 births